Bezozyornoye is a rural locality (a selo) and the administrative center of Raychikhinsky Selsoviet of Bureysky District, Amur Oblast, Russia. The population was 409 as of 2018. There are 17 streets.

Geography 
Bezozyornoye is located on the right bank of the Kupriyanikha River, 74 km west of Novobureysky (the district's administrative centre) by road. Voskresenovka is the nearest rural locality.

References 

Rural localities in Bureysky District